Garfield is an American comic strip created by Jim Davis. Originally published locally as Jon in 1976, then in nationwide syndication from 1978 as Garfield, it chronicles the life of the title character Garfield the cat, his human owner Jon Arbuckle, and Odie the dog. As of 2013, it was syndicated in roughly 2,580 newspapers and journals and held the Guinness World Record for being the world's most widely syndicated comic strip.

Though its setting is rarely mentioned in print, Garfield takes place in Jim Davis's hometown of Muncie, Indiana, according to the television special Happy Birthday, Garfield. Common themes in the strip include Garfield's laziness, obsessive eating, love of coffee and lasagna, disdain of Mondays, and diets. Garfield is also shown to manipulate people to get whatever he wants. The strip's focus is mostly on the interactions among Garfield, Jon, and Odie, but other recurring characters appear as well.

On August 6, 2019, before its merger with CBS Corporation to become ViacomCBS (now Paramount Global), New York City–based Viacom announced that it would acquire Paws, Inc., including most rights to the Garfield franchise (the comics, merchandise and animated cartoons). The deal did not include the rights to the live-action Garfield films, which are still owned by The Walt Disney Company through its 20th Century Studios label, as well as the upcoming animated Garfield film which is set for worldwide distribution by Sony Pictures, except in China, scheduled for after 2021. Jim Davis will continue to make comics, and a new Garfield animated series is in production for Paramount Global subsidiary Nickelodeon.

History

Cartoonist Jim Davis was born and raised in Muncie, Indiana. In 1973, while working as an assistant for T.K. Ryan's Tumbleweeds, he created the comic strip Gnorm Gnat, which ran only in the Pendleton Times of Pendleton, Indiana, from 1973 to 1975 and met with little success. Davis had tried to syndicate the strip, but was unsuccessful; he noted that one editor told him that his "art was good, his gags were great, [but] nobody can identify with bugs." Davis decided to peruse current comic strips to determine what species of animal characters might be more popular. He felt that dogs were doing well, but noticed no prominent cats. Davis figured he could create a cat star, having grown up on a farm with twenty-five cats. Thus was created the character of Garfield.

Garfield, the star, was based on the cats Davis grew up around; he took his name and personality from Davis' grandfather, James A. Garfield Davis, whom he described as "a large, cantankerous man." The name Jon Arbuckle came from a 1950s coffee commercial. Jon's roommate Lyman, added to give Jon someone to talk with, carried on the name of an earlier Gnorm Gnat character. The final character was Lyman's dog Spot, who was renamed Odie so as to avoid confusion with a dog also named Spot in the comic strip Boner's Ark. From 1976 to early 1978, these characters appeared in a strip called Jon which also ran in the Times. The Jon comic strip was largely unknown until 2019, when YouTuber Quinton Hoover found several digital scans of the Jon publications from the Pendleton Community Library and Indiana State Library. Jon first appeared in the Pendleton Times on January 8, 1976, just two weeks after Gnorm Gnat ended.

United Feature Syndicate accepted the strip for national distribution, which had been retitled Garfield on September 1, 1977, in March 1978 (ending its run in the Times on the 2nd) and made its nationwide debut in 41 newspapers on June 19 of that year (however, after a test run, the Chicago Sun-Times dropped it, only to reinstate it after readers' complaints).

The strip underwent stylistic changes, evolving from the style of the 1976–83 strips, to a more cartoonish look from 1984 onward. This change has mainly affected Garfield's design, which underwent a "Darwinian evolution" in which he began walking on his hind legs, "slimmed down", and "stopped looking ... through squinty little eyes" His evolution, according to Davis, was to make it easier to "push Odie off the table" or "reach for a piece of pie".

Garfield quickly became a commercial success. In 1981, less than three years after its nationwide launch, the strip appeared in 850 newspapers and accumulated over $15 million in merchandise. To manage the merchandise, Davis founded Paws, Inc. In 1982 the strip was appearing in more than 1,000 newspapers.

By 2002, Garfield became the world's most syndicated strip, appearing in 2,570 newspapers with 263 million readers worldwide; by 2004, Garfield appeared in nearly 2,600 newspapers and sold from $750 million to $1 billion worth of merchandise in 111 countries. In 1994, Davis's company, Paws, Inc., purchased all rights to the strips from 1978 to 1993 from United Feature.

While retaining creative control and being the only signer, Davis now only writes and usually does the rough sketches. Since the late 1990s most of the work has been done by long-time assistants Brett Koth and Gary Barker. Inking and coloring work is done by other artists, while Davis spends most of the time supervising production and merchandising the characters.

Content
Part of the strip's broad pop cultural appeal is due to its lack of social or political commentary; though this was Davis's original intention, he also admitted that his "grasp of politics isn't strong", joking that, for many years, he thought "OPEC was a denture adhesive".

Originally created with the intentions to "come up with a good, marketable character", Garfield has spawned merchandise earning $750 million to $1 billion annually. In addition to the various merchandise and commercial tie-ins, the strip has spawned several animated television specials, two animated television series, two theatrical feature-length live-action/CGI animated films, and three fully CGI animated direct-to-video films.

Marketing

Garfield was originally created by Davis with the intention to come up with a "good, marketable character". Now the world's most syndicated comic strip, Garfield has spawned a "profusion" of merchandise including clothing, toys, games, books, Caribbean cruises, credit cards, dolls, DVDs of the movies or the TV series, and related media.

Media

Books
Starting in 1980, the comic strip has been collected in anthologies. The first, Garfield at Large, was published in March 1980 by Ballantine Books. These books helped increase the strip's popularity through sales, leading to several of them reaching the top of the New York Times best sellers list. For these compilation books, Davis devised a book layout which is considerably longer and less tall than the average book. This allowed the strip to be oriented in the same format as it appeared in the newspaper, as opposed to earlier comic strip anthologies which often stacked the panels vertically. This book style has since been referred to in the publishing industry as the "Garfield format" and has been adapted by other publishers. Davis noted that it became popular for other comic book anthologies in particular, such as those of The Far Side.

Internet
Garfield.com was the strip's official website, which contained archives of past strips along with games and an online store. Jim Davis had also collaborated with Ball State University and Pearson Digital Learning to create ProfessorGarfield.org, an educational website with interactive games focusing on math and reading skills, and with Children's Technology Group to create MindWalker, a web browser that allows parents to limit the websites their children can view to a preset list.

A variety of edited Garfield strips have been made available on the Internet, with some being hosted on their own unofficial, dedicated sites. Dating from 2005, a site called the "Garfield Randomizer" created a three-panel strip using panels from previous Garfield strips. Another approach, known as "Silent Garfield", involved removing Garfield's thought balloons from the strips. Some examples date from 2006. A webcomic called Arbuckle does the above but also redraws the originals in a different art style. The Arbuckle website creator writes: "'Garfield' changes from being a comic about a sassy, corpulent feline, and becomes a compelling picture of a lonely, pathetic, delusional man who talks to his pets. Consider that Jon, according to Garfield canon, cannot hear his cat's thoughts. This is the world as he sees it. This is his story".

Another variation along the same lines, called "Realfield" or "Realistic Garfield", was to redraw Garfield as a real cat and remove his thought balloons. Still another approach to editing the strips involved removing Garfield and other main characters from the originals completely, leaving Jon talking to himself. While strips in this vein could be found online as early as 2006, the 2008 site Garfield Minus Garfield by Dan Walsh received enough online attention to be covered by news media. Reception was largely positive: at its peak, the site received as many as 300,000 hits per day. Fans connected with Jon's "loneliness and desperation" and found his "crazy antics" humorous; Jim Davis himself called Walsh's strips an "inspired thing to do" and said that "some of [the strips] work better [than the originals]". Ballantine Books, which publishes the Garfield books, released a volume of Garfield Minus Garfield strips on October 28, 2008. The volume retains Davis as author and features a foreword by Walsh.

On June 19, 2020, the website was shut down during the strip's 42nd anniversary, following Viacom's acquisition of Paws, Inc. in August 2019. The website now redirects to Nick.com, with an alternative link to GoComics.

Television

Garfield's animation debut was on The Fantastic Funnies, which aired on CBS on May 15, 1980, voiced by actor Scott Beach. Garfield was one of the strips featured, introduced as a newcomer (the strip was only two years old at the time). From 1982 to 1991, twelve primetime Garfield cartoon specials and one hour-long primetime documentary celebrating the character's 10th anniversary were aired; Lorenzo Music voiced Garfield in all of them. A Saturday morning cartoon show, Garfield and Friends, aired for seven seasons from 1988 to 1994. This adaption also starred Music as the voice of Garfield.

The Garfield Show, a CGI series, started development in 2007 to coincide with the strip's 30th anniversary in 2008. It premiered in France in December 2008 and made its U.S. debut on Cartoon Network on November 2, 2009. A new series is currently in development at Nickelodeon after Paramount Global acquired the franchise.

TV series

Primetime specials

Films

A live-action/computed animated film titled Garfield: The Movie was released in theaters on June 11, 2004 and a sequel titled Garfield: A Tail of Two Kitties was released on June 16, 2006. Both films were released by 20th Century Fox with actor Bill Murray voicing the character in both films. Despite receiving negative reviews from critics, the films were both commercial successes.

Three direct-to-video films were released by 20th Century Fox Home Entertainment, Garfield Gets Real on November 20, 2007, Garfield's Fun Fest on August 5, 2008, and Garfield's Pet Force on June 16, 2009.

On May 24, 2016, it was announced that Alcon Entertainment would develop a new CG animated Garfield film, with John Cohen and Steven P. Wegner producing, and Mark Dindal. In August 2019, Viacom acquired the rights to Garfield, leaving the status of the movie for the time uncertain, with Dindal confirming that the film was still in production in December 2020. On November 1, 2021, Chris Pratt was announced as the voice of Garfield, with animation being provided by DNEG, a production company of the film. David Reynolds was announced as the screenwriter of the film, reuniting him with Dindal after they worked together on The Emperor's New Groove. Sony Pictures will maintain global distribution rights for the film, apart from China.  On May 24, 2022, Samuel L. Jackson joined the voice cast as Vic, Garfield’s father. In September 2022, the film was scheduled to be released on May 24, 2024.

Video games
A Garfield video game was developed by Atari, Inc. for its Atari 2600 home video game system and appears in their 1984 catalog. However, after Atari's spinoff and sale of its home games and computers division, owner Jack Tramiel decided the character's royalties were too expensive given the declining state of the video game industry at the time, and the game was cancelled. A ROM image of the game was however released with Jim Davis' blessing.

Garfield: Big Fat Hairy Deal is a 1987 video game for the Atari ST, ZX Spectrum, Commodore 64, Amstrad CPC and the Amiga based on the comic strip. Towa Chiki made A Week of Garfield for the Family Computer, released only in Japan in 1989. Sega also made the 1995 video game Garfield: Caught in the Act for the Sega Genesis/Mega Drive, Game Gear and Windows 3.1 computers. Other companies made games, such as A Tale of Two Kitties for the DS, published by Game Factory, Garfield's Nightmare for DS, Garfield's Funfest for DS, and Garfield Labyrinth for Game Boy. On PlayStation 2 were Garfield and Garfield 2 (known in the US as Garfield, a Tale of Two Kitties). Garfield Lasagna World Tour was also made for PS2. Garfield: Saving Arlene was only released in Japan and in the United Kingdom. And recent additions for mobile devices are "Garfield's Diner" and "Garfield's Zombie Defense".

Konami also released a Garfield handheld electronic game titled Lasagnator in 1991, which met with mild success.

In 2012, a series of Garfield video games was launched by French publisher Anuman Interactive, including My Puzzles with Garfield!, Multiplication Tables with Garfield, Garfield Kart, and Garfield's Match Up.

Garfield appears as a playable character through free DLC for 2021's Nickelodeon All-Star Brawl.

Stage
Joseph Papp, producer of A Chorus Line, discussed making a Garfield stage musical, but due to some complications, it never got off ground. A full-length stage musical, titled "Garfield Live", was planned to kick off its US tour in September 2010, but got moved to January 18, 2011, where it premiered in Muncie, Indiana. The book was written by Jim Davis, with music and lyrics by Michael Dansicker and Bill Meade, and it was booked by AWA Touring Services. The opening song, "Cattitude" can be heard on the national tour's website, along with two more, "On the Fence", and "Going Home!". When the North-American tour concluded in 2012, it toured throughout Asia.

Comic book
In agreement with Paws, Boom! Studios launched in May 2012 a monthly Garfield comic book, with the first issue featuring a story written by Mark Evanier (who has supervised Garfield and Friends and The Garfield Show) and illustrated by Davis's long-time assistant Gary Barker.

Art book
In 2016, Hermes Press signed an agreement with Paws, Inc to publish an art book on the art of author Jim Davis, titled The Art of Jim Davis' Garfield. The book includes an essay by author R.C. Harvey and other original material, and was released in July 2016 for the San Diego Comic-Con.

Restaurant
In 2018, a ghost restaurant themed after the franchise known as GarfieldEATS was opened in Dubai. Customers order food through the official mobile app, which also contains games and allows users to purchase episodes of Garfield and Friends. The restaurant serves lasagna, Garfield-shaped pizza, "Garfuccinos", and Garfield-shaped dark chocolate bars. A second location opened in Toronto in 2019. Due to the COVID-19 pandemic as well as a dispute over rent, the restaurant closed in 2020.

Main characters

Through the Garfield strips, there have been many additional characters, but the main ones are described here.

Garfield
First appearance: June 19, 1978

Garfield is an orange, fuzzy tabby cat born in the kitchen of an Italian restaurant (later revealed in the television special Garfield: His 9 Lives to be Mama Leoni's Italian Restaurant) who immediately ate all the pasta and lasagna in sight, thus developing his love and obsession for lasagna and pizza.

Gags in the strips commonly deal with Garfield's obesity (in one strip, Jon jokes: "I wouldn't say Garfield is fat, but the last time he got on a Ferris wheel, the two guys on top starved to death") and his disdain of any form of exertion or work. He is known for saying "breathing is exercise".

Though Garfield can be very cynical, he does have a soft side for his teddy bear, Pooky, food, and sleep, and during one Christmas he says, "They say I have to get up early, be nice to people, skip breakfast… I wish it would never end." However, in the feature film Garfield Gets Real and its sequels, Garfield is better behaved, friendlier towards Jon and Odie, less self-centered, and more sympathetic.

It has been wondered by many readers if Garfield can actually be understood by the human characters around him. Sometimes, it seems like Jon can hear him. However, it is mentioned in more than one strip that Jon cannot understand Garfield. However, in the feature film Garfield Gets Real and its sequels, Garfield and the other animals (save for Odie) are able to talk to, and be understood by, Jon and the other humans. In the April 1 (April Fools' Day), 1997, strip drawn by the artists of Blondie as part of the comic strip switcheroo, Garfield, still with thought balloons, can be understood by Jon.

To break the fourth wall, June 19 is celebrated within the strip as Garfield's birthday. The appearance in 1979 claimed it to be his first birthday, although in the first appearance of the strip (June 19, 1978), he was portrayed as a fully grown cat, implying that the birthday is for the strip itself.

Jon Arbuckle
First appearance: June 19, 1978

Jon (Full name: Jonathan Q. Arbuckle) is Garfield's owner, usually depicted as an awkward clumsy geek who has trouble finding a date. Jon had a crush on Liz (Garfield's veterinarian) and is now dating her. Jon disapproves of Garfield's "don't care, not interested", attitude and often encourages his pet to take an interest in the world around him, sometimes stating an interesting fact or asking a philosophical question in an attempt to prompt Garfield into thought. Garfield tends to brush off these attempts with a simple yet logical remark, and despite the trouble Garfield causes, Jon has a heart of gold and is very tolerant of Garfield's shortcomings, a fact which Garfield often takes advantage of. In the December 23, 1980, strip, Jon states that he is thirty years old (nominally meaning he should presently be in his sixties, although he has not aged physically). His birthday is July 28.

Jon loves (or occasionally hates) Garfield and all cats. Many gags focus on this; his inability to get a date is usually attributed to his lack of social skills, his poor taste in clothes (Garfield remarked in one strip after seeing his closet that "two hundred moths committed suicide"; in another, the "geek police" ordered Jon to "throw out his tie"), and his eccentric interests which range from stamp collecting to measuring the growth of his toenails to watching movies with "polka ninjas". Other strips portray him as lacking intelligence (he is seen reading a pop-up book in one strip).

Jon was born on a farm that apparently contained few amenities; in one strip, his father, upon seeing indoor plumbing, remarks: "Woo-ha! Ain't science something?" Jon occasionally visits his parents, brother and grandmother at their farm. It was implied that Jon is inspired by a drawing of Davis himself when he was first drawing the strip. Jon was portrayed as a cartoonist in the first strip and occasional others in the early years; Davis stated his intent had been to express his own frustrations as a cartoonist. Ultimately, Jon's job has been referenced far more frequently in Garfield animated series than in the strip.

Odie
First appearance: August 8, 1978

Odie is a yellow, long-eared beagle with a large, slobbering tongue, who walks on all four legs, though occasionally he will walk on two like Garfield. He was originally owned by Jon's friend Lyman, though Jon adopted him after Lyman was written out of the strip. The book Garfield: His 9 Lives (1984) retcons Odie's origin: there is no mention of Lyman, and Odie was a puppy when he was acquired by Jon as company for Garfield (when Garfield was a kitten).

Odie is younger than Garfield and usually portrayed as naïve, happy, affectionate and blissfully unaware of Garfield's cynical, sadistic nature, despite the physical abuse Garfield exhibits toward him, including regularly kicking him off the kitchen table or tricking him into going over the edge himself. On some occasions, however, he is depicted more intelligently, as in one strip, in which he holds a heavy rock to prevent Garfield from doing this, and actually hurts Garfield's foot. In one strip when Garfield and Jon are out of the house, Odie is seen reading War and Peace and watching An Evening With Mozart on television, but in "Ask a Dog" strips, he is depicted as illiterate and has to be read to by Garfield. Odie has only thought once. In another strip, published on January 28, 2010, he is seen solving Jon's sudoku puzzle.

Dr. Liz Wilson
First appearance: June 26, 1979

Dr. Liz Wilson is Garfield and Odie's sarcastic veterinarian and a long time crush of Jon Arbuckle. She has a somewhat deadpan, sardonic persona and almost always reacts negatively to Jon's outlandish and goofball behavior but can even find it endearing on occasion. Jon often attempts to ask her out on a date, but rarely succeeds; however, in an extended story arc from June 20 to July 29, 2006 (with the main event taking place on July 28), Liz and Jon kiss, and have been a couple ever since.

Recurring subjects and themes

Many of the gags focus on Garfield's obsessive eating and obesity; his dislike of spiders; his hatred of Mondays, diets, and any form of exertion; his constant shedding (which annoys Jon); and his abuse of Odie and Jon as well as his obsession with mailing Nermal to Abu Dhabi, or simply throwing him through the front door. Though he will eat nearly anything (with the exception of raisins and spinach), Garfield is particularly fond of lasagna; he also enjoys eating Jon's houseplants and other pets (mainly birds and fish).

He also has odd relationships with household pests; Garfield generally spares mice, and even cooperates with them to cause mischief (much to Jon's chagrin), but will readily swat or pound spiders flat. Other gags focus on Jon's poor social skills and inability to get a date; before he started dating Liz, he often tried to get dates, usually without success (in one strip, after failing to get a date with "Nancy", he tries getting a date with her mother and grandmother; he ended up getting "shot down by three generations"). When he does get a date, it usually goes awry; Jon's dates have slashed his tires, been tranquilized, and called the police when he stuck carrots in his ears. The storylines featuring Jon's dates rarely appear now. Before, he had dates with many odd characters, whereas now, he exclusively dates Liz.

Garfield's world has specific locations that appear normally on the comic strips, like the vet's office (a place he loathes). Irma's Diner is another occasional setting. Irma is a chirpy but slow-witted and unattractive waitress/manager, and one of Jon's few friends. The terrible food is the center of most of the jokes, along with the poor management. Jon periodically visits his parents and brother on the farm. This results in week-long comical displays of stupidity by Jon and his family, and their interactions. There is a comic strip where Jon's brother Doc Boy is watching two socks in the dryer spinning and Doc Boy calls it entertainment.

On the farm, Jon's mother will cook huge dinners; Garfield hugs her for this. Jon has a grandmother who, in a strip, once kicked Odie; Garfield subsequently hugged her. Jon's parents have twice visited Jon, Garfield, and Odie in the city. Jon's father drove into town on his tractor (which he double-parked) and brought a rooster to wake him up. As Garfield has a love for food, they will often eat out at restaurants. Most trips end up embarrassing because Garfield will pig out, or Jon will do something stupid, including wearing an ugly shirt, which happened one night when he took Liz on a date. When Jon takes Liz on a date, Garfield occasionally tags along—once, he ate the bread and other food at an Italian restaurant they went to.

Frequently, the characters break the fourth wall, mostly to explain something to the readers, talk about a subject that often sets up the strip's punchline (like Jon claiming that pets are good for exercise right before he finds Garfield in the kitchen and chases him out), or give a mere glare when a character is belittled or not impressed. Sometimes, this theme revolves around the conventions of the strip; for example, in one strip, Garfield catches a cold and complains about it, noting that his thoughts are stuffed up.

Short storylines
One particular semi-recurring storyline features Jon and Liz on a date in a restaurant. They sometimes are waited on by the Italian Armando, who is refined and sophisticated and shows a great loathing towards Jon, presumably for his immature and uncouth behavior at the prestigious eatery. On other occasions, the couple receives a different waiter, such as a large ogre-like man who intimidates Jon when he is about to report a complaint about the food.

Another commonly recurring character, although hardly ever seen, is Jon's neighbor, Mrs. Feeny. Garfield seems to take both enormous pride and excess zeal in doing whatever it takes to harass her, to the point that she even erects an electric fence (which does not stop him).

Other unique themes are things like "Garfield's Believe it or Don't", "Garfield's Law", "Garfield's History of Dogs", and "Garfield's History of Cats", which show science, history, and the world from Garfield's point of view. Another particular theme is "National Fat Week", where Garfield spends the week making fun of skinny people. Also, there was a storyline involving Garfield catching Odie eating his food and "kicking Odie into next week". Soon, Garfield realizes that "Lunch isn't the same without Odie. He always slips up behind me, barks loudly and makes me fall into my food" (Garfield subsequently falls into his food by himself).

A few days after the storyline began, Garfield is lying in his bed with a "nagging feeling I'm forgetting something", with Odie landing on Garfield in the next panel. Jon and Liz began to go out more frequently. Jon has started hiring pet sitters to look after Garfield and Odie, though they do not always work out. Two particular examples are Lillian, an eccentric (and very nearsighted) old lady with odd quirks, and Greta, a muscle-bound woman who was hired to look after the pets during New Year's Eve.

Most of December is spent preparing for Christmas, with a predictable focus on presents. Other Christmas themed strips include Jon's attempts at decorating the tree and house, or the attempt to buy the tree. Some years, the Christmas strips started as early as the end of November. Another example is "Splut Week", when Garfield tries to avoid pies that are thrown at him. For most of Garfield's history, being hit with a pie has inevitably resulted in the onomatopoeia "splut", hence the name.

Every week before June 19, the strip focuses on Garfield's birthday, which he dreads because of his fear of getting older. This started happening after his sixth birthday. However, before his 29th birthday, Liz put Garfield on a diet. On June 19, 2007, Garfield was given the greatest birthday present: "I'M OFF MY DIET!" Occasionally the strip celebrates Halloween as well with scary-themed jokes, such as mask gags. There are also seasonal jokes, with snow-related gags common in January or February and beach- or heat-themed jokes in the summer.

One storyline, which ran the week before Halloween in 1989, is unique among Garfield strips in that it is not meant to be humorous. It depicts Garfield awakening in a future in which the house is abandoned and he no longer exists. In Garfield's Twentieth Anniversary Collection, in which the strips are reprinted, Jim Davis discusses the genesis for this series:

One of the recurring storylines involves Garfield getting lost or running away. The longest one of these lasted for over a month (in 1986, from August 25 to September 28); it began with Jon telling Garfield to go get the newspaper. Garfield walks outside to get it, but speculates about what will happen if he wanders off – and decides to find out. Jon notices Garfield has been gone too long, so he sends Odie out to find him. He quickly realizes his mistake (Odie, being not too bright, also gets lost).

Jon starts to get lonely, so he offers a reward for the return of Garfield and Odie. He is not descriptive, so animals including an elephant, monkeys, a seal, a snake, a kangaroo and joey, and turtles are brought to Jon's house for the reward. After a series of events, including Odie being adopted by a small girl, both pets meeting up at a circus that they briefly join, and both going to a pet shop, Garfield and Odie make it back home.

Another story involved Jon going away on a business trip around Christmas time, leaving Garfield a week's worth of food, which he devoured instantly. Garfield then leaves the house and gets locked out. He then reunites with his mother, and eventually makes it back home in the snow on Christmas Eve (December 3–23, 1984). Part of this storyline was taken from the 1983 Emmy-winning special Garfield on the Town.

Paws, Inc.

Paws, Inc. was founded in 1981 by Jim Davis to support the Garfield comic strip and its licensing. It is located in Muncie, Indiana, and has a staff of nearly 50 artists and licensing administrators. In 1994, the company purchased all rights to the Garfield comic strips from 1978 to 1993 from United Feature Syndicate. However, the original black and white daily strips and original color Sunday strips remain copyrighted to United Feature Syndicate. The full-color daily strips and recolored Sunday strips are copyrighted to Paws as they are considered a different product. Though rights to the strip remain with Paws, Inc., it is currently distributed by Universal Press Syndicate. In August 2019, Davis sold Paws, Inc. to Viacom, who has placed Garfield under the Nickelodeon banner.

Notes

Bibliography

Primary sources

Secondary sources

References

External links

Archive of Garfield.com on its last day before conversion
Garfield at Don Markstein's Toonopedia. Archived from the original on August 1, 2016.
The Garfield Show
Official website of the stage musical

1978 comics debuts
 
Comic strips set in the United States
Comics about cats
Comics about dogs
Indiana culture
Comics set in Indiana
Mass media franchises
American comic strips
Gag-a-day comics
American comics adapted into films
Comics adapted into television series
Comics adapted into animated series
Comics adapted into video games
Fictional characters who break the fourth wall
Slice of life comics
Nickelodeon
Paramount Global franchises